Jennifer Anne Reich is an American sociologist, researcher and author at the University of Colorado Denver. Her research interests include healthcare, adolescence, welfare, and policy. Her work on vaccine hesitancy gained widespread attention during the 2019 measles outbreaks. She is the author of three books and numerous journal articles.

Education

Reich attended Calabasas High School and subsequently earned her B.A. at the University of California, Santa Barbara and her M.A. and Ph.D. at the University of California, Davis. She has been a tenured professor at the University of Denver, where she was a faculty member for ten years and is currently a tenured and full professor at the University of Colorado Denver.

Reich is Vice President of the American Sociological Association.

Vaccine hesitancy
Reich spent nearly ten years exploring what motivates some parents to decline inoculations for their children, or delay them. Her interviews with parents and subsequent research are presented in her 2016 book Calling the Shots: Why Parents Reject Vaccines. She sees vaccine hesitancy as a consequence of societal pressures on parents (especially middle-class mothers) to make choices that are uniquely suited to their own children in terms of health and education, to maximize their chances of success in life: "We do vaccines in a way that has been shown to be scientifically the most efficacious and the safest and also the easiest to distribute at a national level. But for parents who really prioritize each child in their family as an individual, they don't accept this kind of logic." Working full-time on their kids, these parents are inclined to disregard generic advice dispensed by health professionals.

Facing a steady stream of misleading information, pediatricians and public health professionals have to know what motivates parents to be reluctant about vaccines, and to adjust how they communicate, says Reich. She suggests pediatricians have more success having a fruitful dialogue when they can communicate with empathy, parent-to-parent. How to put the focus on collective benefits - explaining own inoculation better protects all children - may be a way for public health authorities to overcome the reluctance of many parents.

Selected publications

Books 
2021 State of Families: Law, Policy, and the Meanings of Relationships https://www.routledge.com/The-State-of-Families-Law-Policy-and-the-Meanings-of-Relationships/Reich/p/book/9780367027766

Selected journal articles

References

External links

Year of birth missing (living people)
Living people
American women social scientists
20th-century American women scientists
21st-century American women scientists
21st-century social scientists
20th-century social scientists
American women sociologists
University of California, Santa Barbara alumni
University of California, Davis alumni
University of Denver faculty
University of Colorado Denver faculty
American sociologists